Nand Kishore Singh Degree College is a self-financed college situated 7 km to{clarify|which direction?|date=May 2021}} the banks of river Ganga at Naini, Allahabad in Uttar Pradesh India. Established in 2000 in the Dhanuha, Chaka, neighbourhood of Naini, the college offers diploma, bachelor's and master's degree courses like BA, Bsc, MA, Msc, D.Pharma, B.Pharma, LLB, B.Ed, and D.El.Ed. It is affiliated with professor Rajendra Singh (Rajju Bhaiya) University [previously known as Allahabad State University]].

References

External links
 

Universities and colleges in Allahabad
Educational institutions established in 2006
2006 establishments in Uttar Pradesh